Vojko Šeravić (22 October 1926 – 28 February 2006) was a Croatian rower. He competed in the men's eight event at the 1952 Summer Olympics.

References

1926 births
2006 deaths
Croatian male rowers
Olympic rowers of Yugoslavia
Rowers at the 1952 Summer Olympics
Rowers from Split, Croatia